Chindian (is an informal term used to refer to a person of mixed Chinese and Indian ancestry; i.e. from any of the host of ethnic groups native to modern China and India. There are a considerable number of Chindians in Malaysia and Singapore. In Maritime Southeast Asia, people of Chinese and Indian origin immigrated in large numbers during the 19th and 20th centuries. There are also a sizeable number living in Hong Kong and smaller numbers in other countries with large overseas Chinese and Indian diaspora, such as Jamaica, Trinidad and Tobago, Suriname and Guyana in the Caribbean, as well as in Indonesia, the Philippines, the United States, Canada, United Kingdom, Australia, and New Zealand.

Countries

China

Zhang Qian (d. 113 BC) and Sima Qian (145-90 BC) make likely references to "Shendu ("Sindhu" in Sanskrit), and during Yunnan's annexation by Han Dynasty in the first century an Indian "Shendu" community was living there. During transmission of Buddhism from India to China from the first century onwards, many Indian scholars and monks travelled to China, such as Batuo (fl. 464-495 AD)—founder of the Shaolin Monastery—and Bodhidharma—founder of Chan/Zen Buddhism and there was also a large Indian trader community in Quanzhou City and Jinjiang district who built more than a dozen Hindu temples or shrines, including two grand big temples in Quanzhou city. During colonial era, Indians were among the crew of the Portuguese ships trading on the Chinese coast beginning in the sixteenth century and Indians from Portuguese Indian Colonies (notably Goa) settled in Macau in small numbers.

There are 45-48,000 Indian nationals/expatriates living in mainland China as of 2015, most of whom are students, traders and professionals employed with Indian IT companies and banks. There are three Indian community associations in the country.

Hong Kong
Indians have been living in Hong Kong long before the partition of India into the nations of India and Pakistan. They migrated to Hong Kong as traders, police officers and army officers during colonial rule.

2,700 Indian troops in Hong Kong arrived with British occupation on 26 January 1841, who later played an important role in setting up of the University of Hong Kong (HKU) and the Hong Kong and Shanghai Banking Corporation (HSBC). 25,000 of the Muslims in Hong Kong trace their roots back to what is now Pakistan. Around half of them belong to 'local boy' families, Muslims of mixed Chinese (Tanka) and Indian/Pakistani ancestry, descended from early Indian/Pakistani male immigrants who took local Chinese wives and brought their children up as Muslims. These "local Indians" were not completely accepted by either the Chinese or Indian communities.

India

There are tiny communities of Chinese who migrated to India during the British Raj and became naturalised citizens of India and there are 189,000 estimated total ethnic Chinese of Chindian or full Chinese ancestry. The community living in Kolkata numbers around 4,000 and 400 families in Mumbai, where there are Chinatowns. Chinese Indians also contributed to the development of fusion Indian Chinese cuisine (Chindian cuisine), which is now an integral part of the Indian culinary scene.

There are an estimated 5,000–7,000 Chinese expatriates living in India as of 2015, having doubled in number in recent years. Most work on 2- to 3-year contracts for the growing number of Chinese brands and companies doing business in India.

British India

During the British Raj, some Chinese "convicts" deported from the Straits Settlements were sent to be jailed in Madras in India. The "Madras district gazetteers, Volume 1" reported an incident where the Chinese convicts escaped and killed the police sent to apprehend them: "Much of the building work was done by Chinese convicts sent to the Madras jails from the Straits Settlements (where there was no sufficient prison accommodation) and more than once these people escaped from the temporary buildings' in which they were confined at Lovedale. In 186^ seven of them got away and it was several days before they were apprehended by the Tahsildar, aided by Badagas sent out in all directions to search. On 28 July in the following year twelve others broke out during a very stormy night and parties of armed police were sent out to scour the hills for them. They were at last arrested in Malabar a fortnight later. Some police weapons were found in their possession and one of the parties of police had disappeared—an ominous coincidence. Search was made all over the country for the party and at length, on 15 September, their four bodies were found lying in the jungle at Walaghát, half way down the Sispára ghát path, neatly laid out in a row with their severed heads carefully placed on their shoulders. It turned out that the wily Chinamen, on being overtaken, had at first pretended to surrender and had then suddenly attacked the police and killed them with their own weapons." Other Chinese convicts in Madras who were released from jail then settled in the Nilgiri mountains near Naduvattam and married Tamil Paraiyan women, having mixed Chinese-Tamil children with them. They were documented by Edgar Thurston. Paraiyan is also anglicised as "pariah".

Edgar Thurston described the colony of the Chinese men with their Tamil pariah wives and children: "Halting in the course of a recent anthropological expedition on the western side of the Nilgiri plateau, in the midst of the Government Cinchona plantations, I came across a small settlement of Chinese, who have squatted for some years on the slopes of the hills between Naduvatam and Gudalur and developed, as the result of ' marriage ' with Tamil pariah women, into a colony, earning an honest livelihood by growing vegetables, cultivating coffee on a small scale and adding to their income from these sources by the economic products of the cow. An ambassador was sent to this miniature Chinese Court with a suggestion that the men should, in return for monies, present themselves before me with a view to their measurements being recorded. The reply which came back was in its way racially characteristic as between Hindus and Chinese. In the case of the former, permission to make use of their bodies for the purposes of research depends essentially on a pecuniary transaction, on a scale varying from two to eight annas. The Chinese, on the other hand, though poor, sent a courteous message to the effect that they did not require payment in money, but would be perfectly happy if I would give them, as a memento, copies of their photographs." Thurston further describe a specific family: "The father was a typical Chinaman, whose only grievance was that, in the process of conversion to Christianity, he had been obliged to 'cut him tail off.' The mother was a typical Tamil Pariah of dusky hue. The colour of the children was more closely allied to the yellowish tint of the father than to the dark tint of the mother and the semimongol parentage was betrayed in the slant eyes, flat nose and (in one case) conspicuously prominent cheek-bones." Thurston's description of the Chinese-Tamil families were cited by others, one mentioned "an instance mating between a Chinese male with a Tamil Pariah female" A 1959 book described attempts made to find out what happened to the colony of mixed Chinese and Tamils.

According to Alabaster there were lard manufacturers and shoemakers in addition to carpenters. Running tanneries and working with leather was traditionally not considered a respectable profession among caste Hindus and work was relegated to lower caste muchis and chamars. There was a high demand, however, for high quality leather goods in colonial India, one that the Chinese were able to fulfill. Alabaster also mentions licensed opium dens run by native Chinese and a Cheena Bazaar where contraband was readily available. Opium, however, was not illegal until after India's Independence from Great Britain in 1947. Immigration continued unabated through the turn of the century and during World War I partly due to political upheavals in China such as the First and Second Opium Wars, First Sino-Japanese War and the Boxer Rebellion. Around the time of the First World War, the first Chinese-owned tanneries sprang up.

In Assam, local Assamese women married Chinese migrants during British colonial times. It later became hard to physically differentiate Chinese in Assam from locals during the time of their internment during the 1962 war, as the majority of these Chinese in Assam were mixed.

Singapore
In Singapore, the majority of interracial marriages occur between Chinese women and Indian men. The government of Singapore classifies them as their father's ethnicity. According to government statistics, 2.4% of Singapore's population are multiracial, mostly Chindians. The highest number of interethnic marriages was in 2007, when 16.4% of the 20,000 marriages in Singapore were interethnic, again mostly between Chinese and Indians. Singapore only began to allow mixed-race persons to register two racial classifications on their identity cards in 2010. Parents may choose which of the two is listed first. More than two races may not be listed even if the person has several different ethnicities in their ancestry. Like in Malaysia, most Chindians in Singapore are offspring of interracial relationships between Indian males and Chinese females.

Malaysia
In Malaysia, the majority of interracial marriages occur between Chinese and Indians. The offspring of such marriages are informally known as "Chindian". The Malaysian government, however, considers them to be an unclassified ethnicity, using the father's ethnicity as the informal term. As the majority of these intermarriages usually involve an Indian male and Chinese female, the majority of Chindian offspring in Malaysia are usually classified as "Malaysian Indian" by the Malaysian government.

Guyana
In Guyana, Chinese men married Indian women due to the lack of Chinese women in the early days of settlement. Creole sexual relationships and marriages with Chinese and Indians were rare, however it has become more common for Indian women and Chinese men to establish sexual relations with each other and some Chinese men took their Indian wives back with them to China. Indian women and children were brought alongside Indian men as coolies while Chinese men made up 99% of Chinese coolies.

The contrast with the female to male ratio among Indian and Chinese immigrants has been compared by historians.

Mauritius
In the late 19th to early 20th century, Chinese men in Mauritius married Indian women due to both a lack of Chinese women and higher numbers of Indian women on the island. At first, the prospect of relations with Chinese men was unappealing to the original all-female Indian migrants yet they eventually had to establish sexual unions with Chinese men since there were no Chinese women coming. The 1921 census in Mauritius counted that Indian women there had a total of 148 children sired by Chinese men. These Chinese were mostly traders. Colonialist stereotypes in the sugar colonies of Indians emerged such as "the degraded coolie woman" and the "coolie wife beater", due to Indian women being murdered by their husbands after they ran away to other richer men since the ratio of Indian women to men was low. It was much more common for Chinese and Indians to intermarry than within their own group. Intermarriage between people of between different Chinese and Indian language groups is rare; it is so rare that the cases of intermarriage between Cantonese and Hakka can be individually named. Similarly, intermarriage between Hakka Chinese and Indians hardly occurs.

Trinidad
In Trinidad, some Chinese men had relationships with Indian coolie women of Madrasee origin, siring children with them and it was reported that "A few children are to be met with born of Madras and Creole parents and some also of Madras and Chinese parents - the Madrasee being the mother", by the missionary John Morton in 1876, Morton noted that it seemed strange since there were more Indian coolie men than Indian coolie women that Indian coolie women would marry Chinese men, but claimed it was most likely because the Chinese could provide amenities to the women since the Chinese owned shops and they were enticed by these. Indian women were married by indentured Chinese men in Trinidad. Few Chinese women migrated to Trinidad while the majority of Chinese migrants were men. The migration of Chinese to Trinidad resulted in intermarriage between them and others. Chinese in Trinidad became relatively open to having marital relations with other races and Indian women began having families with Chinese in the 1890s.

Notable people

 Juanita Ramayah, Malaysian radio announcer and TV Personality
 Jacintha Abisheganaden, Singaporean actress
 Ronald Arculli, Chairman of Hong Kong Exchanges and Clearing and Non-official Members Convenor of the Executive Council of Hong Kong (Exco).
 Vivian Balakrishnan, Singaporean politician
 Indranee Rajah, Singaporean politician
 Darryl David, Singaporean politician and former media personality
 Meiyang Chang Actor, Singer, TV Host in India
 Bernard Chandran, Malaysian fashion designer
 Anya Ayoung-Chee, winner of Miss Trinidad and Tobago Universe 2008 and contestant in the Miss Universe 2008 pageant
 Chen Gexin, Chinese songwriter
 Che'Nelle (Cheryline Lim), Malaysian-born recording artist signed to Virgin Records America
 Karen David, British singer-songwriter born in Meghalaya, India
 Nicol David, Malaysian athlete and former world number one female squash player
 Vanessa Fernandez, Singaporean singer and radio presenter
 Jonathan Foo, Guyanese cricketer 
 Patricia Chin, Jamaican-American co-founder of VP Records
 Hedy Fry, Trinidadian-Canadian politician
 Jonathan Putra, Malaysian TV Personality
 Jwala Gutta, Indian badminton player
 Sahil Khan, Indian actor
 Law Lan, Hong Kong actress
 Mak Pak Shee, Singaporean politician
 Nicole Narain, American model
 Francissca Peter, Malaysian singer
 Joseph Prince, Singaporean pastor and evangelist
 Michelle Saram, Hong Kong actress born in Singapore
 Astra Sharma, Australian tennis player
 Priscilla Shunmugam, Singaporean fashion designer
 Dipna Lim Prasad, Singaporean sprinter and hurdler
 Gurmit Singh, Singaporean television personality
 Prema Yin, Malaysian singer
 Nadine Ann Thomas, Miss Universe Malaysia 2010, actress, model and DJ.
 Vanessa Tevi Kumares, Miss Universe Malaysia 2015
 Joshua Simon, Singaporean radio and media personality, YouTube star
 Leong Hong Seng, former Malaysian professional footballer of MK LAND FC
 Liew Kit Kong, former Malaysia national capped footballer
 Ramesh Lai Ban Huat, Malaysia professional footballer
 Raj Joshua Thomas, Singapore Nominated Member of Parliament
 Kimmy Jayanti, Indonesian model and actress
 Mavin Khoo,  Bharata Natyam dancer
 Bilahari Kausikan, Singaporean diplomat

See also
 Chindia
 Chinas
 Chinese people in India
 Indians in China
 China–India relations
 Race in Singapore

References

External links
 An illusion of purity
 Double-tongued dictionary

Ethnic groups in Malaysia
Ethnic groups in Indonesia
Ethnic groups in Fiji
Indian diaspora in Singapore
Multiracial affairs